The 2007 World Youth Championships in Athletics were the fifth edition of the IAAF World Youth Championships in Athletics. They were held on 11–15 July 2007 in Ostrava, Czech Republic.

Results

Boys

Girls

Medals table

See also 
 2007 in athletics (track and field)

External links 
 Official results

2007
World Youth Championships
International athletics competitions hosted by the Czech Republic
Sport in Ostrava
World Youth Championships In Athletics, 2007
2007 in youth sport